Thomas Joseph Erak is an American singer, songwriter, and musician from Mukilteo, Washington, best known as a founding member of the Seattle-based progressive mathcore band, The Fall of Troy and as a member of the band Just Like Vinyl; as well as his recent solo experiment Thomas Erak and The Shoreline. He is a former member of the band Chiodos.

Early life and youth career
According to Thomas' appearance on the That One Time On Tour podcast, Thomas' father was a touring, for-hire bass player in the 70s and 80s, and helped him get into music as a young child. Initially, he began playing drums, often practicing music from jazz and funk greats like Miles Davis, Ray Charles, and James Brown. Later on, he picked up bass around the age of 7 and excelled at the instrument, learning entire songs by ear. At  age 12, Thomas started playing guitar, often playing Nirvana and Green Day, before moving onto more technical music, such as Sunny Day Real Estate and Deftones, all of which he has claimed to be influences on his music career. Erak attended Kamiak High School and graduated in 2003. While there, he met fellow Fall of Troy member Andrew Forsman while participating in the Kamiak Show Band drumline. Along with classmates Mike Munro and Tim Ward, they formed a band called The 30 Years War. Munro left the band during their late high school years, and in 2003 the remaining members renamed the band to The Fall of Troy.

Career

The Fall of Troy
After forming in 2003, while in high school, the band released their first album through Lujo Records. Erak remained with the band until their 2010 hiatus, and joined again in 2013 when the band announced its reunion. The band has since released OK in 2016 independently to critical and fan acclaim alike. The band had been hinting at new material in 2019 that eventually became 2020’s Mukiltearth. The band announced a weekend of shows on the east coast, as well of a handful of shows in California to close out 2019,to garner attention for the aforementioned Mukiltearth. More recently, they played several shows across the United States for the 20th anniversary of their self titled album.

Just Like Vinyl
During The Fall of Troy's hiatus, Erak played in the rock band Just Like Vinyl. They released two albums that are still available, the first being self-titled and the second being Black Mass released by Superball Records. Erak has said in many interviews he believes that Black Mass is one of his personally favorite albums he has had a part in making. The band is currently on Hiatus as Erak works on new music/The Fall of Troy.

Chiodos
In 2012, Erak joined Chiodos as the lead guitarist and backup vocalist. He is featured on their 2014 album, Devil.

He left Chiodos on December 9, 2014 to focus on the next The Fall of Troy album.

Pushover
Erak and ex-Dance Gavin Dance singer Kurt Travis released a 3-song "Demo" in 2017 via Travis’ Esque records, and have been since rumored to have recorded a full-length LP that has yet to be released.

Other groups
During the Fall of Troy's original run, he was the lead vocalist in local Seattle Hardcore band "The Hills Have Eyes". He also spent a brief period of time as the drummer for The Monday Mornings. The Fall of Troy bandmate Andrew Forsman replaced him when he left. In early 2015, Erak performed with instrumental progressive rock band Chon at SXSW for Audiotree, and played a variety of songs from The Fall of Troy, Just Like Vinyl, and a cover of Nirvana's "Heart Shaped Box". Despite being called a one-of-a-kind performance, Erak has since played two other shows with Chon. At the Audiotree Music Festival 2016 in Kalamazoo, Michigan, members of Chon featured with The Fall of Troy in multiple songs. Then, on Chon's "Super Chon Bros" tour stop in Detroit, Michigan, Erak performed on Chon's song "Can't Wait" and then the group proceeded to play The Fall of Troy's song "F.C.P.R.E.M.I.X." In 2018 Erak released an EP titled The Whole Story under the name "Thomas Erak and The Shoreline" which was music all written and recorded by Erak himself with help from former bandmate Jake Carden of Just Like Vinyl, and a couple other friends. The EP was released by Blue Swan records. Interestingly, Erak recorded the music in a very interesting and difficult format. Where he would start with the drums, and basically improv drum tracks to a chosen BMP or "click track" until the drums made up a song. He would then repeat this with bass, then guitars, and finally vocals. Erak stated in his biography "the making of the Whole Story" that he wanted to challenge himself, and used this opportunity as an experiment to "see if he could even do this by myself". The EP is full of experiments in genre for Erak as it both harkens back to his post-punk/hardcore roots with tracks like "Sick and Tired" as well as prog-rock, "Silver Tongue". The EP also explored genres yet explored by Erak, that tend to be some of the most interesting moments of The Whole Story such as "Payday Loans" An almost Alt-County anthem. As well as almost straight forward Pop-Rock with songs like "He Said, She Said" and ballad, "Heartpoon". Erak has said in the future he hopes to experiment more with "The Shoreline" moniker, but for now is hard at work on a brand new project that is yet to be named, but will be released in 2020, as well as a long-rumoured upcoming release from The Fall of Troy "Mukiltearth" once again.

Discography

Studio albums 
The Thirty Years' War
 Martyrs Among the Casualties EP (2002)
The Fall of Troy
 The Fall of Troy (2003)
 Ghostship EP/Demo (2004)
 Doppelgänger (2005)
 Manipulator (2007)
 Phantom on the Horizon EP (2008)
 In the Unlikely Event (2009)
 OK (2016)
 Mukiltearth (2020)
Just Like Vinyl
 Just Like Vinyl (2010)
 Black Mass (2012)
Chiodos
 Devil (2014)
Push Over
 Demo EP (2017)
Spit Spot
Spit Spot (2017)
Solo Albums
 The Whole Story (EP) (2018)

Live albums 
The Thirty Years' War
 Live at the Paradox (2002)
The Fall of Troy
 Live at the Boardwalk (2007)

Collaborations 
 "I.D.F.A.R." (with Ashley Mendel and Ben Kenney)
 Multiple songs and features throughout The Woods Brothers' debut album. (Also featuring Casey Crescenzo of The Dear Hunter)

Guest appearances 
 Fear Before
 "Review Our Lives (Epic)" (2008)

References

Musicians from Seattle
People from Mukilteo, Washington
Living people
21st-century American musicians
21st-century American male musicians
Chiodos members
The Fall of Troy members
Year of birth missing (living people)